is a Japanese manga series written and illustrated by Tsutomu Takahashi. It was serialized in Kodansha's seinen manga magazine Monthly Afternoon from 1992 to 1999, with its chapters collected in nineteen tankōbon volumes. The story follows Kyoya Ida, a plainclothes police officer, and his colleagues at the Shinjuku Police Department as they investigate and solve crimes in the Greater Tokyo Area. Sometimes, these crimes are solved with some prices to pay.

A sequel, titled Jiraishin Diablo, was serialized in Kodansha's Good! Afternoon from 2008 to 2011, with its chapters collected in three tankōbon volumes. It portrays Ida and his interactions with various people after his absence from the force due to an eye disease while hearing of mysterious deaths of villagers living in the fictional Amakura Island in Japan's Ishikawa Prefecture in the year 2008 while assisting a police detective in initially trying to figure out who or what was responsible for their deaths after it was reported back in 2007.

Plot

Jiraishin: Ice Blade
Kyoya Ida is a hard-nosed detective from the Shinjuku Police precinct, known to use lethal force to solve cases whenever they need to be solved. He works in a bleak, gritty representation of Shinjuku alongside his partner Tsuyoshi Yamaki in hunting down suspects and arresting them before he was killed in the line of duty. Ida was later assigned to another partner named Eriko Aizawa, the two working together to solve cases pertaining to the city's interests.

Jirashin Diablo
In the year 2008, Ida was beginning to suffer from the effects of Keratoconus after leaving the police force. He later gets wind of mysterious deaths of an unknown plague that killed the villagers in Ishikawa Prefecture's Amakura Island when he meets up with Taichi Kogure, a detective of the Ishikawa Police precinct and a now grown up Aya Koike, who is a known information handler in the underworld.

Publication

Written and illustrated by Tsutomu Takahashi, Ice Blade was serialized in Kodansha's seinen manga magazine Monthly Afternoon from the 1992 to 1999 (November 1992–January 2000 issues). Kodansha collected its chapters in nineteen tankōbon volumes, released from October 23, 1993, to January 21, 2000. The series was republished in a ten-volume bunkoban edition in 2003, and in a ten-volume aizoban edition in 2009. to November 20, 2009.

The North American version of the manga, retitled Ice Blade, was serialized in Tokyopop's MixxZine, but it was discontinued after three volumes. When Jiraishin was serialized as Ice Blade in MixxZine, there were instances of censorships in some of its panels as it was a new magazine when it was released and did not wish to offend potential distributors.

It was licensed in France by Génération Comics; in Italy by Stars Comics; in Germany by Carlsen Comics; in South Korea by Samyang Comics; and in Taiwan by Tong Li Comics.

Jiraishin Diablo was serialized in Kodansha's Good! Afternoon magazine from November 7, 2008, to November 7, 2011. Kodansha collected its chapters in three tankōbon volumes, released from February 5, 2010, to December 7, 2011.

Reception
Serdar Yegulalp of Advanced Media Network compares Jiraishin to Miami Vice as the "blood, grit, and sin spatter so thickly that it's a miracle you don't get your fingers dirty when you turn the pages".

It was nominated for the 23rd Kodansha Manga Awards in the general category in 1999.

References

External links
 

Detective anime and manga
Kodansha manga
Seinen manga
Tokyopop titles